Ole Mofjell (born 11 July 1990) is a Norwegian drummer known from bands like Brute Force and COKKO, married July 29, 2016, to singer Natalie Sandtorv.

Career 
Mofjell was born in Søgne, and started his drumming career when given a sharp drum for his sixth birthday by his father. He got his formal music education on the Jazz program at Trondheim Musikkonsevatorium.

Mofjell resided in Berlin until he moved to Copenhagen in 2015. He performed on scenes throughout Europe with projects like the quartet 'Brute Force' with a current self-titled album (2014) and the duo 'Not On The Guest List', together with his cohabitant girlfriend Natalie Sandtorv. He is also active in other projects like 'One Out Of Town' and the duo 'Tysk Impro' with trumpeter Erik Kimestad Pedersen, in addition to the release of his debut solo album (2015).

Honors 
2015: Recipient of the Sparebanken Sør Musikkpris

Discography 

With Brute Force
2014: Brute Force (Va Fongool)

With Rob Void 3.0
2014: Nonfigurativ Musikk 5 (Nonfigurativ Musikk)

With Cokko
2016: The Dance Upon My Grave (Playdate Records)

With Not On The Guest List
2016: Free! Spirit! Chant! (Gaffer Records)

With Nypan
2017: Stereotomic (Losen Records)

References 

21st-century Norwegian drummers
Norwegian jazz drummers
Male drummers
Norwegian percussionists
Norwegian University of Science and Technology alumni
Norwegian composers
Norwegian male composers
1990 births
Living people
People from Søgne
21st-century Norwegian male musicians
Male jazz musicians
Morning Has Occurred members